Joshua Lucas Easy Dent Maurer (born June 20, 1971) is an American actor. He is best known for his roles in various films, including American Psycho (2000), You Can Count on Me (2000), The Deep End (2001), A Beautiful Mind (2001), Sweet Home Alabama (2002), Hulk (2003), An Unfinished Life (2005), Glory Road (2006), Poseidon (2006), Life as We Know It (2010), The Lincoln Lawyer (2011), Red Dog (2011), J. Edgar (2011), The Mend (2014), Breakthrough (2019), Ford v Ferrari (2019), and The Forever Purge (2021). He has also appeared in television series such as The Firm (2012), The Mysteries of Laura (2014–2016), and Yellowstone (2018–2022).

Early life

Lucas was born Joshua Lucas Easy Dent Maurer on June 20, 1971, in Little Rock, Arkansas, the son of Michele (née LeFevre), a nurse midwife, and Don Maurer, an ER doctor.

Lucas grew up traveling the South with his parents, who were antinuclear activists, and his three younger siblings. 

By the age of 13, he had lived in 30 different locations, including the Isle of Palms and Sullivan's Island (both in South Carolina). His mother attended Emerson College with Jay Leno. The family eventually settled in Gig Harbor, Washington. He attended Kopachuck Middle School and graduated from Gig Harbor High School in 1989, where he acted in high school plays.

Career

Lucas began his career when he was 19, having moved to Hollywood after his high school graduation. He appeared as a guest star on several TV sitcoms in his early 20s, including Fox's True Colors and Parker Lewis Can't Lose, the family drama Life Goes On, and CBS's private-eye show Jake and the Fatman.

Other projects included the horror-thriller Child of Darkness, Child of Light, an adaptation of James Patterson's novel Virgin, a tale of two Catholic schoolgirls who find themselves pregnant under mysterious and supernatural circumstances. Lucas followed this appearance by working with executive producer Steven Spielberg and then-unknown actor Clive Owen in the TV-movie Class of '61, which follows the stories of a group of West Point cadets in 1861 as the Civil War breaks out. Lucas played George Armstrong Custer.

Soon afterward, he made his feature film debut in Frank Marshall's Alive about a group of Uruguayan rugby players who, after crashing in the Andes mountains, resort to cannibalism to stay alive. After a brief appearance in the Patrick Swayze comedy Father Hood, Lucas relocated to Australia to play the hotheaded American cousin Luke McGregor opposite Andrew Clarke and Guy Pearce in the first season of the family western Snowy River: The McGregor Saga. Lucas appeared in all 13 episodes of the first season, but claimed in a later interview that despite the friendly environment, he was homesick for the United States, and his character was killed off in the second episode of season 2. 

Upon returning to the States, he was still receiving offers as high school/college boyfriends and felt he was not getting the age-appropriate roles he sought. While working with George C. Scott on a TV-movie from the In the Heat of the Night series, Scott told him he needed to take acting lessons and develop his talent for both stage and screen. Shortly thereafter, he departed Hollywood and moved to New York City, where he studied privately with various acting coaches.

The second part of his career began with a lead role in the British rowing film True Blue (released in the US as Miracle at Oxford), in which he played a hotshot Navy rower who was recruited along with three other Americans to help Oxford win its annual boat race with Cambridge. He followed that with relatively small roles in the dramas Minotaur and Harvest. He took his first stab at comedy in The Definite Maybe, in which he played a recent college graduate who gets fired from his job and schemes with an old friend to purchase a house in the Hamptons.

He appeared as an American businessman in Jule Gilfillan's romantic comedy-drama Restless. He also appeared in an off-Broadway production of Terrence McNally's controversial Corpus Christi, a retelling of the Passion, with the Jesus character (named Joshua) and his disciples all being gay. Lucas played the role of Judas as a gay predator. Right before the play was to open, Lucas was mugged and beaten on his way to the theater for dress rehearsal. He played the role of Judas with bloody bandages across his broken nose and black eyes. The audience thought the bandages were part of the play. Following a series of operations to reset his nose, he began gathering larger roles in films like American Psycho, The Weight of Water, Session 9, The Dancer, When Strangers Appear, and You Can Count on Me.

One of Lucas' first feature roles was playing Jace "Flash" Dillon in the cinematic PC flight simulator Wing Commander III: Heart of the Tiger.

Lucas gained mainstream exposure after his roles in Sweet Home Alabama, A Beautiful Mind, and as Glenn Talbot in Hulk. He later had leading roles in movies such as Glory Road, Poseidon, and Stealth. In Glory Road, he starred as basketball coach Don Haskins, a role for which he gained .

His next project was Boaz Yakin’s Death in Love. Peacock is another film in which he starred. Lucas starred in the 2009 Ridley Scott-produced Tell-Tale, a film based on the short story "The Tell-Tale Heart" by Edgar Allan Poe. 

Earlier that year, Lucas was seen on stage in the off-Broadway run of Spalding Gray: Stories Left to Tell. Lucas also completed his second collaboration with documentary film maker Ken Burns, after being involved in Burns’ The War. Lucas' other documentary work includes Operational Homecoming, Trumbo, and the Los Angeles Film Festival Audience Award-winning Resolved. In February 2010, he was cast in the Anders Anderson thriller Stolen the single father of a mentally challenged boy, starring alongside Rhona Mitra and Jon Hamm; the film had a limited theatrical release in March 2010. Lucas also co-stars in the 2010 film Shadows and Lies alongside James Franco and Julianne Nicholson. 

In 2011, Lucas co-starred with Rachael Taylor in the film Red Dog, based on the true story of an Australian Kelpie. Lucas won an Inside Film Award for his role. He also starred in the NBC television show The Firm, which takes place ten years after the John Grisham novel it is based on. The show lasted one season.

In 2013, Lucas was cast as the lead role in the independent comedy-drama, The Mend. The directorial debut of John Magary premiered at South By Southwest in March 2014 with Lucas receiving a series of positive reviews for his portrayal of Mat, one of two dysfunctional brothers who collide in a small Harlem apartment. From September 2014 to March 2016, Lucas appeared as a main character in the NBC crime drama The Mysteries of Laura.

In 2018, Lucas was cast in a recurring role in Yellowstone, as a younger version of John Dutton, portrayed by Kevin Costner.

Lucas's career also includes voice-over work (or voice acting) with Breathe Bible.

Lucas is an owner and promoter of the company Filthy Food with friends Marc and Daniel Singer.

Personal life

Lucas met freelance writer Jessica Ciencin Henriquez at a dog park in 2011. They became engaged six weeks later and married on March 17, 2012, in Central Park. Their son, Noah Rev Maurer, was born in June 2012. In January 2014, Ciencin Henriquez filed for a divorce that became final in October 2014. 

A YouthAIDS Ambassador, Lucas "first joined the YouthAIDS team when he shot the ALDO HIV/AIDS awareness campaign in April, 2005. Soon after, he officially accepted his role as a YouthAIDS Ambassador at the YouthAIDS 2005 Gala, Faces of Africa. HIV/AIDS prevention is particularly important to him as his mother 'has made a career counseling young men and women with the hopes of educating them about the ravaging and often deadly effects of this too common and easily preventable disease.'"

Politics
Lucas supported President Barack Obama during the 2008 presidential campaign, volunteering to help potential voters register at colleges in Pennsylvania. Lucas knocked on doors and phone banked, wearing an Obama shirt for 45 days. He was also in Denver, Colorado, for the 2008 Democratic National Convention with a group of actors called the Creative Coalition.

Filmography

Film

Television

Theatre

Video games

References

External links

 
 Aboutfilm.com interview (October, 2004)

1971 births
20th-century American male actors
21st-century American male actors
American male film actors
American male television actors
American male voice actors
Living people
Male actors from Little Rock, Arkansas
People from Gig Harbor, Washington